The Universität der Künste Berlin (UdK; also known in English as the Berlin University of the Arts), situated in Berlin, Germany, is the largest art school in Europe. It is a public art and design school, and one of the four research universities in the city.

The university is known for being one of the biggest and most diversified universities of the arts worldwide. It has four colleges specialising in fine arts, architecture, media and design, music and the performing arts with around 3,500 students. Thus the UdK is one of only three universities in Germany to unite the faculties of art and music in one institution. The teaching offered at the four colleges encompasses the full spectrum of the arts and related academic studies in more than 40 courses. Having the right to confer doctorates and post-doctoral qualifications, Berlin University of the Arts is also one of Germany's few art colleges with full university status.

Outstanding professors and students at all its colleges, as well as the steady development of teaching concepts, have publicly defined the university as a high standard of artistic and art-theoretical education. Almost all the study courses at Berlin University of the Arts are part of a centuries-old tradition. Thus Berlin University of the Arts gives its students the opportunity to investigate and experiment with other art forms in order to recognise and extend the boundaries of their own discipline, at an early stage of rigorously selected artists and within the protected sphere of a study course.

Within the field of visual arts, the university is known for the intense competition that involves the selection of its students, and the growth of applicants worldwide has increased during the years due to Berlin's important current role in cultural innovation worldwide. In the same way, the University of the Arts is publicly recognized for being on the cutting edge in the areas of Visual Arts, Fashion Design, Industrial Design, and Experimental Design.

History
The university's origins date back to the foundation of Academie der Mal-, Bild- und Baukunst (Academy of the Art of Painting, Pictorial Art, and Architecture), the later Prussian Academy of Arts, at the behest of Elector Frederick III of Brandenburg. The two predecessor organisations were Königliche Akademische Hochschule für ausübende Tonkunst (Royal Academy of Musical Performing Art) established in 1869 under Joseph Joachim, which also had adopted the tradition of the famous Stern Conservatory, and the Berlin State School of Fine Arts founded in 1875.

In 1975, both art schools merged under the name Hochschule der Künste Berlin, HdK. The organization received the title of a university on 1 November 2001.

Exchange program
The exchange program with UDK is a direct enrollment program offered during the fall, spring, and academic year to students interested in the arts and with four semesters of German language study. Each academic year the school receives 100 exchange students on the basis of institutional agreements. Students participating in the exchange are required to subsidize their own accommodations with little help from the school.

Art fair
Annually, the university opens its doors to the public in its four colleges (UdK Rundgang), offering one of the most important art fairs in Berlin due to new proposals that highlight its young artists.

Notable alumni

 Claudio Arrau, pianist
 Claudia Barainsky, soprano
 Esther Berlin-Joel (1895–1972), graphic designer
 F. W. Bernstein (1938–2018), poet, cartoonist, satirist and academic
 Norbert Bisky, painter
 Antonia Brico, pianist and conductor
 Kai Bumann (1961–2022), conductor
 Antonio Piedade da Cruz, (1895–1982) Indian painter and sculptor
 Daniela Comani, painter
 Marie Fillunger, opera singer
 Caroline Fischer, pianist
 Bruno Flierl, architect and city planner
 Eduard Franck
 Catherine Gayer, coloratura soprano
 Ria Ginster, soprano
 Leopold Godowsky, pianist
 Günter Grass, sculptor, 1999 Nobel prize in Literature
 Burkhard Held, painter
 Carla Henius, mezzo-soprano
 Philip A. Herfort, violinist, orchestra leader
 Arnulf Herrmann, composer
 Li Hua, artist
 Ali Kaaf, artist
 Ingo Kühl, painter, sculptor and architect
 Christian Leden, ethno-musicologist; composer
 Kim Yusob, South-Korean painter
 Otto Kinkeldey, (1878–1966), musicologist, academic music library pioneer
 Otto Klemperer, conductor
 Uwe Kröger, actor, singer
 Felicitas Kukuck, composer
 Josephine Meckseper, artist
 Una H. Moehrke, painter
 Moritz Moszkowski, pianist, composer
 Isabel Mundry, composer
 Adolfo Odnoposoff, cellist
 Rudolph Polk, violinist
 Enno Poppe, composer
 Max Raabe artist
 Hermann Rosendorff, conductor, composer 
 SEO, artist
 Herbert Schachtschneider (1919–2008), operatic tenor
 Gabriel and Maxim Shamir, (previously Scheftelovich), early 1930s, Graphic Artists
 Christine Schäfer, soprano
 Martina Schumacher, painter
 Maya Shenfeld, composer and musician
 Paul Gutama Soegijo, composer and musician
 Kathrin Sonntag, artist
 Agnes Stavenhagen, soprano
 Bertha Tideman-Wijers, composer
 Sarah Traubel, soprano
 Richard Aaker Trythall, pianist, composer
 Agnes Tschetschulin, composer, violinist
 Christa Frieda Vogel, photographer
 Jorinde Voigt, artist
 Ignatz Waghalter, composer, conductor
 Bruno Walter, conductor
 Kurt Weill, composer
 Wang Xiaosong, artist
 Isang Yun, composer

Notable teachers

Ineke Hans 2017 –
Hito Steyerl
Ai Weiwei 2012–
Joseph Ahrens 1945–1969
Georg Baselitz −2005
F. W. Bernstein, (1984–1999)
Jolyon Brettingham Smith 1977–1981
Beatrix Borchard
Siegfried Borris
Katharina Sieverding
John Burgan 1996–2001
Massimo Carmassi
Tony Cragg −2006
Pascal Devoyon 1996–
Olafur Eliasson 2009–2014
Heinz Emigholz
Valérie Favre 2006–
Emanuel Feuermann 1929–1933
Friedrich Goldmann 1991–2005
Christian Grube 1973–
Elisabeth Grümmer 1965–1986
Byung-Chul Han 2012–
Pál Hermann 1902–1944
Fons Hickmann 2007–
Paul Hindemith 1895–1963
Karl Hofer
Leiko Ikemura
Amalie Joachim
Joseph Joachim 1869–1907
Gesche Joost 2011–
Mark Lammert 2011–
Mark Lammert 2011–
Axel Kufus 2004 –
 Lula Mysz-Gmeiner 1920–1945
Aurèle Nicolet 1926–
Corinna von Rad
Daniel Richter 2005–2006
Max Rostal 1928–1933
Joachim Sauter 1991–2021
Arnold Schoenberg 1922–1933
Ernst Gerold Schramm
Clara Schumann 1819–1896
Laszlo Simon 1981–2009
Walter Stöhrer
Witold Szalonek 1973–?
Leo van Doeselaar 1995–2019
Jean-Philippe Vassal 2012–
Vivienne Westwood 1993–2005
Josef Wolfsthal 1926–1931
Ji-Yeoun You 2009–
Isang Yun (composer) 1970–85
Siegfried Zielinski 2007–
Walter Zimmermann 1993–
Thomas Zipp 2008–

See also

 Spandauer Kirchenmusikschule, which became part of the Musikhochschule Berlin in 1998
 Universities and research institutions in Berlin
 Humboldt University of Berlin
 Technical University of Berlin
 University of Potsdam

References

External links
Berlin University of the Arts 

 
Music schools in Germany
Performing arts education in Germany
Universities and colleges in Berlin
Buildings and structures in Charlottenburg-Wilmersdorf
Public universities
Educational institutions established in the 1690s
1696 establishments in the Holy Roman Empire